Robert E. Danielson (born c. 1918) is a former American football coach.  He served the head football coach at Huron College—later known as Huron University—in Huron, South Dakota from 1947 to 1949, and North Dakota State University from 1957 to 1962, compiling a career college football coaching record of 27–48–4.  A native of Minneapolis, Minnesota, Danielson played college football at Gustavus Adolphus College and the University of Minnesota.

Head coaching record

References

Year of birth missing (living people)
1910s births
Possibly living people
American football guards
Gustavus Adolphus Golden Gusties football players
Huron Screaming Eagles football coaches
Minnesota Golden Gophers football players
North Dakota State Bison football coaches
Sports coaches from Minneapolis
Coaches of American football from Minnesota
Players of American football from Minneapolis